Claud Raymond VC (2 October 1923 – 22 March 1945) was a British recipient of the Victoria Cross, the highest and most prestigious award for gallantry in the face of the enemy that can be awarded to British and Commonwealth forces. As a member of an old County Kerry family with strong links to the Indian Army, Raymond is also regarded as an Irish VC.

Details
Claud Raymond was the son of Lieutenant Colonel Maurice Claud Raymond CIE, MC, and Margaret Lilias Nancy Raymond (née Brown), of Fulham. He was 21 years old, and a Lieutenant in the Corps of Royal Engineers, British Army during the Second World War when the following deed took place for which he was awarded the VC.

On 21 March 1945 at Talaku, Burma (now Myanmar), Lieutenant Raymond was second-in-command of a reconnaissance patrol when they were fired on by a strongly entrenched enemy detachment and the lieutenant at once led his men towards the position. He was first wounded in the shoulder and then in the head, but continued leading his men forward, when he was hit a third time, his wrist being shattered. He still carried on into the enemy defences where he was largely responsible for capturing the position. In spite of the gravity of his wounds, he refused medical aid until all the other wounded had received attention. He died the next day, aged 21.

Legacy
Raymond grew up in Seaford, Sussex, and is remembered on the town's war memorial. A road in the town is also named after him.

The Medal
His Victoria Cross is displayed at the Royal Engineers Museum in Chatham, Kent.

References

British VCs of World War 2 (John Laffin, 1997)
Irish Winners of the Victoria Cross (Richard Doherty & David Truesdale, 2000)
Monuments to Courage (David Harvey, 1999)
The Register of the Victoria Cross (This England, 1997)
The Sapper VCs (Gerald Napier, 1998)

External links

CWGC entry
Royal Engineers Museum Sappers VCs
 

1923 births
1945 deaths
British Army personnel killed in World War II
Military personnel from the Isle of Wight
Royal Engineers officers
People from Seaford, East Sussex
People educated at Wellington College, Berkshire
Alumni of Trinity Hall, Cambridge
British World War II recipients of the Victoria Cross
British Army recipients of the Victoria Cross
Burials at Taukkyan War Cemetery